Joseph-Arsène Bonnier (November 25, 1879 - August 20, 1962) was a Canadian politician, contractor, person of independent means and undertaker.

Born in Saint-Urbain, Quebec, Canada, Bonnier was elected to the House of Commons of Canada in a 1938 by-election for the riding of St. Henry to represent the Liberal Party. He was re-elected in 1945, 1949, 1953 and 1957. Prior to his federal political career, he was an alderman for Montreal, Quebec between 1936 and 1942.

External links
 

1879 births
1962 deaths
Liberal Party of Canada MPs
Members of the House of Commons of Canada from Quebec